"Who I Am" is the debut single by Nick Jonas & the Administration, released in December 2009. It is from their 2010 debut album of the same name. The group performed the song for the first time at the Grammy Nominations concert live special on December 2, 2009.

Background and composition

Talking about his album's title track, Nick (the leader) says "It's about how I want someone to love me for my passion for music. It's all I've ever thought about "Who I Am is really about me talking about myself and realizing you need to know yourself before you can find love."

Release
"Who I Am" has been confirmed to be the first single from Nick Jonas and the Administration's debut album. It was released as a digital download on December 3, 2009.

The single was featured on Radio Disney Jams, Vol. 12, along with songs by other popular artists. Jams 12 was officially released on March 30, 2010.
On May 11, 2010, it the song was used on the live album: Nick Jonas & The Administration Live at the Wiltern January 28th, 2010.
It was also released in 2010 on the karaoke video game Disney Sing It: Party Hits.

Track list
Digital single

Other versions
 Who I Am (radio edit) – 3:35
 Who I Am (live) – 5:23

Cover version
In July 2010, singer David Choi released a cover of the song on his cover album YouTube Covers.

Music video
The basis of the video is a section of him performing with his band along with shots of different people ranging from a gothic girl to someone who had cancer that has existed for three generations of family. They are looking for 'Real life individuals to pose for living portraits that tell us who they are. Each subject flips the card to reveal a simple statement of identity, including himself identifying himself as a brother, a diabetic and "just me".'

A music video ecard was also released for the song "Who I Am".

Live performances
Jonas performed the song live for the first time during the Grammy Award nominations. The song was also performed on the Who I Am Tour with the Administration. On January 29, 2010, he performed the song with his brothers during the concert.

Nick Jonas & Sonny Thompson performed on January 30, 2010, an acoustic version of the song "Tonight" along with the songs "Who I Am" and "Last Time Around" during Radio Disney Total Access.
As of August 7, 2010 he performs the song during the Jonas Brothers Live In Concert World Tour 2010.

On February 23, 2011, Nick performed the song during an acoustic set, accompanied by Jonas Brothers guitarist John Taylor.

Along with Sonny Thompson, Jonas performed at the Military Event in Columbus, Ohio on April 14, 2011. He played the songs "Last Time Around" and "Who I Am."
And on June 8, 2011, Jonas performed the songs solo while in New York 
On July 1, Jonas performed the song live during the Microsoft Store Grand Opening in Century City.
They performed the song on July 16, during the Ottawa Blues fest.
The song was also performed during the concerts in South America.

On December 16, a teaser for the next Fandrop episode went online, it shows Jonas playing the intro of "Who I Am". This episode premiered on December 20, 2011
On December 20 the episode was online, it shows Nick performing Who I Am.

On May 20, 2012, Nick performed an acoustic version of the song in between two shows of How to Succeed in Business Without Really Trying.

The song was performed during all of the Jonas Brothers World Tour 2012/2013.
They performed the song again on June 1 during the Acapulco Festival in Mexico.
The song "Who I Am" was performed again during  the Jonas Brothers Live Tour.

Nick has performed the song at selected dates on two of his solo tours, Nick Jonas: Live in Concert (2015) and Future Now Tour (2016)

Personnel
 Nick Jonas – lead vocals, lead guitar, composer
 Tommy Barbarella – keyboards
 Michael Bland – drums, vibraphone, vocals
 Sonny Thompson – guitars, vocals (on DVD Who I Am, and live performances)
 John Fields – bass, guitars, percussion, vibraphone, producer
 David Ryan Harris – guitars, vocals (on CD Who I Am)
Dave McNair – mastering
Jon Lind – A&R
David Snow – creative director
Enny Joo – art direction
Olaf Heine – photography
Paul David Hager – mixing
Philip McIntyre – management
Johnny Wright – management
Kevin Jonas SR. – management

Charts

Release history

References

2009 songs
2009 debut singles
Nick Jonas & the Administration songs
Songs written by Nick Jonas
Blues rock songs
Hollywood Records singles
Song recordings produced by John Fields (record producer)